Julian Johnsson (born 24 February 1975) is a Faroese former professional football midfielder.

Club career
He played in the Faroe Islands for Tórshavn sides HB Tórshavn and B36 Tórshavn, before moving abroad to play in the Norwegian, English and Icelandic leagues. He left Hull City in 2002 after his wife failed to settle.

International career
Johnsson made his debut for the Faroe Islands in an April 1995 European Championship qualifying match against Finland. He has earned 62 caps and 4 goals for the Faroe Islands national football team between 1995 and 2006. He is the third most capped player for the Faroe Islands national side.

International goals
Scores and results list Faroe Islands' goal tally first.

References

Bibliography
 2006: Føroyingurin úr Danmark

External links
 Svendborg profile
 B68 Toftir profile
 
 Hull City stats

1975 births
Living people
Faroese footballers
Faroe Islands international footballers
Kongsvinger IL Toppfotball players
Faroese expatriates in Iceland
Sogndal Fotball players
Hull City A.F.C. players
Julian Johnsson
Eliteserien players
Expatriate footballers in Norway
Expatriate footballers in England
Faroese writers
Expatriate footballers in Iceland
Havnar Bóltfelag players
B36 Tórshavn players
SfB-Oure FA players
Faroese expatriates in Norway
Association football midfielders
SfB-Oure FA managers